The women's super-G at the 1999 Asian Winter Games was held on 1 February 1999 at the Yongpyong Resort in South Korea.

Schedule
All times are Korea Standard Time (UTC+09:00)

Results

References

Results

External links
Schedule

Women super-G